Profitis Ilias Greek Orthodox Church is a Greek Orthodox church located outside Endeavour, Saskatchewan, Canada, and dedicated to the Prophet Elias. It was built in 2008 on the private property of Ilias Barlas.

There is a traditional Greek celebration every July 20 to celebrate Profitis Ilias memory at the church. On July 20, 2009, the Greek Orthodox Church celebrated the life of Profitis Ilias (The Prophet Elias or Elijah). On this special occasion, Ilias Barlas, family and friends christened this small church and dedicated it to the memory of Profitis Ilias. The service was conducted by Father Michael Michael of Koimisis Tis Theotokou Greek Orthodox Church, Saskatoon SK.

Dedication: Because the clouds of flying miracles. Because the mystery of lights that show us the dream.

References

Churches in Saskatchewan
Preeceville No. 334, Saskatchewan
Churches completed in 2008
Greek-Canadian culture
Greek Orthodox churches
Eastern Orthodox church buildings in Canada
21st-century churches in Canada